Vintage Faire Mall is a shopping mall located in Modesto, California, USA. It is owned and operated by Macerich and is adjacent to State Route 99. The mall is a hub for StanRTA bus service.

History
In 2001, the mall's owner Macerich invested $10 million in an extensive renovation that included new escalators, new railings and carpet on the second floor, new tiles on the first floor, modern light fixtures and new exterior signage. A new elevator was built in the center of the mall and a wing of the second floor was converted into a food court.

In 2008, the mall opened an expansion that added a new outdoor "lifestyle center" to the former parking lot space between a mall entrance and what was previously Forever 21. The new expansion, called "The Village at Vintage Faire Mall", added several new retailers including Apple, BJ's Restaurant & Brewhouse, Coach, Chico's, Charming Charlie, Sephora, Men's Wearhouse, Chipotle Mexican Grill and Buffalo Wild Wings.

In 2015, Sears Holdings spun off 235 of its properties, including the Sears at Vintage Faire Mall, into Seritage Growth Properties.

Anchor stores 
JCPenney 
Macy's Men's and Home (Former Gottschalks (original location))
Macy's Women's and Children 
Furniture City (Former Forever 21)
 Dick's Sporting Goods

Former
Forever 21 - In October 2019, the store was listed to close amid the company's Chapter 11 Bankruptcy filing. Liquidation began in November 2019. Forever 21 closed its doors for the final time on December 31, 2019.
Gottschalks - Closed in 2009 due to company's bankruptcy and liquidation. Building was taken over by Forever 21.
Sears - On October 15, 2018, it was announced that this location would be closing as part of the company's ongoing downsizing. This location closed permanently on January 6, 2019. The building has remained unoccupied. By the end of September 2019, the interior was gutted to make room for Dick's Sporting Goods and the auto center was demolished for a Dave and Buster's.
Weinstock's - Closed in 1996 due to being acquired by Macy's. Building was taken over by Gottschalks.

References

Shopping malls in Stanislaus County, California
Macerich
Buildings and structures in Modesto, California
Shopping malls established in 1977